Quds Day, officially known as International Quds Day, is an annual pro-Palestinian event held on the last Friday of the Islamic holy month of Ramadan to express support for Palestinians and oppose Israel and Zionism. It takes its name from the Arabic-language name for Jerusalem: . The event was initiated in 1979 in Iran, shortly after the Islamic Revolution. Nominally, it exists in opposition to Israel's Jerusalem Day, which has been celebrated by Israelis since May 1968 and was declared a national holiday by the Knesset in 1998.

Quds Day is also held in several other countries, mainly in the Arab world and broader Muslim world, with protests against the Israeli occupation of East Jerusalem. Rallies are held in various countries by both Muslim and non-Muslim communities around the world.

Critics of Quds Day argue that it is inherently antisemitic. In Iran, Quds Day also features demonstrations against other countries, including the United States and Saudi Arabia.

History
An annual anti-Zionist day of protest was first suggested by Ebrahim Yazdi, the first foreign minister of the Islamic Republic of Iran, to Ruhollah Khomeini, the leader of the Iranian Revolution. At the time, its predominant context was related to deepening tensions between Israel and Lebanon. Khomeini adopted Yazdi's idea, and on 7 August 1979, he declared the last Friday of every Ramadan as "Quds Day", in which Muslims worldwide would unite in solidarity against Israel and in support of the Palestinians. Khomeini stated that the "liberation" of Jerusalem was a religious duty to all Muslims:

There have been recorded incidents of violence on Quds Day, including 28 people killed and 326 wounded by bombs in 1985 during the Iran–Iraq War. Iran celebrates the event characteristically by putting on public display poster images of the city of Jerusalem, thematic speeches, art exhibitions reflecting the issue, and folkloric events. In Lebanon, Hezbollah marks the occasion by organizing a substantive military parade for the last week of each Ramadan. Since 1989, Jordan has observed the event by hosting academic conferences, whose venue from university to university varies each year. Arab societies generally pay the occasion lip service in order to make a show of solidarity with the cause of Palestinian aspirations for nationhood.

The day is also marked throughout Muslim and Arab countries. In January 1988, during the First Intifada, the Jerusalem Committee of the Organization of the Islamic Conference decided that Quds Day should be commemorated in public events throughout the Arab world. In countries with significant Shia Muslim populations, particularly Lebanon, where Hezbollah organizes Quds Day observances, there is significant attendance at the day's events. Events are also held in Iraq, the Palestinian Gaza Strip, and Syria. Both Hamas and Palestinian Islamic Jihad endorse Quds Day and hold ceremonies. Outside of the Middle East and the wider Arab world, Quds Day protests have taken place in the United Kingdom, Germany, Canada, Sweden, France, the United States, as well as some Muslim countries in Southeast Asia. According to the BBC, while the original idea behind Quds Day was to gather all Muslims in opposition to the existence of Israel, the event has not developed beyond an Iranian experience. Apart from rallies, usually funded and organized by Iran itself in various capital cities, the ritual never took root among Muslims at large.

Quds Day events

In Iran, the day's parades are sponsored and organized by the government. Events include mass marches and rallies. Senior Iranian leaders give fiery speeches condemning Israel, as well as the U.S. government. The crowds respond with chants of "Death to Israel", and "Death to America". According to Roger Howard, many Iranians under the age of 30 continue to participate in Quds Day events, though proportionately less than those on the streets. He adds that many Iranian students on campus say in private that the Arab–Israeli conflict has "nothing to do with us."

Quds Day protests have been held in parts of the Middle East and in London and Berlin and the United States. Marches in London have drawn up to 3,000 people, while Berlin saw 1,600 protestors in 2018. Rallies were held in at least 18 cities across the United States in 2017.

In 2020, for the first time since the initiation four decades ago, the Quds day event was held virtually in Iran amid the COVID-19 pandemic.

Gallery

See also
 Iran–Israel relations
 Jumu'ah-tul-Wida, also on the last Friday in the month of Ramadan
 Quds in Persian literature
 Death to America

References

External links

 International Quds Day in Hamasna official website
 Ayotollah Khomeini's pronouncements on al-Quds
 Jihad and jingoism on Iran's streets Guardian Unlimited on Quds Day demonstrations
 Iranian protesters in the 2009 Quds day, shouting slogans against the Iranian government

1979 establishments in Iran
Recurring events established in 1979
Anti-Zionism
Foreign relations of Iran
Iran–Israel relations
Palestinian politics
Late modern history of Jerusalem
International observances
Observances set by the Islamic calendar
Islamic terminology
August observances